St John of Beverley Church is a Roman Catholic parish church in Beverley, East Riding of Yorkshire, England. It was built from 1897 to 1898 in the Gothic revival style. It is located on the corner of York Street and the North Bar in the centre of the town. It is a Grade II listed building.

History

Foundation
In 1791, a Catholic chapel was built in Beverley. In 1846, a church was built. It as the first Catholic church to be built in Beverley since the Reformation. From there, priests would go out to serve the local Catholic population in places such as Bridlington. A school and a presbytery were built next to the church.

Construction
From 1897 to 1898, the current church was built. It was designed by the architectural firm of Smith, Brodrick & Lowther from Hull, comprising Richard George Smith, Frederick Stead Broderick and Arthur Randall Lowther, who also designed Our Lady and St Peter's Church in Bridlington. The total cost of the church came to £1,560 and it was paid by Lady Sykes of Sledmere House, wife of Sir Tatton Sykes, 5th Baronet and mother of Mark Sykes.

Parish
The priest at St John of Beverley Church also serves the surrounding parishes of Sacred Heart Church in Hornsea and Most Holy Sacrament Church in Marton. St John of Beverley Church has two Sunday Masses at 6:30pm on Saturday and at 10:45am on Sunday.

Interior

See also
 
 Diocese of Middlesbrough

References

External links
 
 Diocese of Middlesbrough page for the parish

Beverley
Grade II listed churches in the East Riding of Yorkshire
Roman Catholic churches in the East Riding of Yorkshire
Roman Catholic Diocese of Middlesbrough
Grade II listed Roman Catholic churches in England
Gothic Revival church buildings in England
19th-century Roman Catholic church buildings in the United Kingdom
Roman Catholic churches completed in 1898
1898 establishments in England